Cheaters is a 2022 British sitcom and comedy first broadcast on BBC One in February 2022. The first series, originally created for BBC Three by Oliver Lyttleton, consists of all fully 10-minute episodes, broadcast as triple-features. The plot revolves around an adulterous couple and their paramours.

The cast includes Susan Wokoma, Joshua McGuire, Jack Fox and Callie Cooke. Guests include Jim Norton.

Broadcast
Cheaters premiered on BBC One HD on 15 February 2022.

In Australia, the series premiered on 10 HD based in Sydney and Melbourne.

Reception
Jack Seale of The Guardian gave the series 4 out of 5 stars.

References

External links
 Cheaters on iPlayer
 

2022 British television series debuts
2020s British sitcoms
English-language television shows
Television series by BBC Studios